Jeannette Lois Bell (born September 2, 1941) is an American Democratic politician and social worker from Wisconsin.

Early life and education 
Bell was born on September 2, 1941, in Milwaukee, Wisconsin. Her parents are Harold Arthur Jeske and Luella Ruth Jeske (nee Block). She graduated from Rufus King International High School and received her bachelor's degree in legal studies from the University of Wisconsin–Milwaukee in 1988. She worked in a nursing home as an activities coordinator and as the supervisor of a youth employment program.

Political career 
From 1983 until 1997, Bell served in the Wisconsin State Assembly. In 1996, Bell resigned from the Wisconsin State Assembly to serve as Mayor of West Allis, Wisconsin until her retirement in 2008.

Personal life 
She married Chester Robert Bell and they have three children: Chester III, Colleen and Edith.

Notes

Politicians from Milwaukee
People from West Allis, Wisconsin
University of Wisconsin–Milwaukee alumni
Democratic Party members of the Wisconsin State Assembly
Women mayors of places in Wisconsin
Women state legislators in Wisconsin
Mayors of places in Wisconsin
1941 births
Living people
Rufus King International High School alumni
21st-century American women